B68 Toftir II is a Faroese football team, playing in the village of Toftir, Faroe Islands. It is the reserve team of the Faroese Premier League club, B68 Toftir and like most reserve teams, the best players are sent up to the senior team, meanwhile developing other players for further call-ups. Like the senior team, B68 Toftir II play their home games at Svangaskarð.

Reserve teams in Faroe Islands play in the same league system as the senior team, rather than in a reserve team league. They cannot play in the same division as their senior team, however, so B68 Toftir II is ineligible for promotion to the Faroese Premier League and cannot play in the Faroese Cup.

Current squad
''As of September 13, 2012

Staff
Manager: Øssur Hansen
Coach: Oddmar Andreassen
Coach: Ovi Brim
Coach: Jóhan Petur Poulsen
Team chief: Trúgvi Súnason í Hjøllum

See also
B68 Toftir

External links
 Official website

Football clubs in the Faroe Islands
Association football clubs established in 1962
1962 establishments in the Faroe Islands